Jowhar District is a district of the southeastern Middle Shabelle in Somalia. Its capital lies at Jowhar. The district had estimated population of 269,851 as of 2014, a survey was done by (UNDP) in 2014.

References

External links
 Districts of Somalia
 Administrative map of Jowhar District

Districts of Somalia

Middle Shabelle